Fifteenmile Creek is a stream in Goliad, Victoria and DeWitt counties, in the U.S. state of Texas.

Fifteenmile Creek was named from its distance,  from Clinton, Texas.

See also
List of rivers of Texas

References

Rivers of DeWitt County, Texas
Rivers of Goliad County, Texas
Rivers of Victoria County, Texas
Rivers of Texas